Akiyama Dam is a dam in Nagano Prefecture, Japan.

See also

 List of dams and reservoirs in Japan

Dams in Nagano Prefecture
Gravity dams